Peter G. Christie (March 9, 1941 – May 31, 2021) is a former accountant and political figure in Nova Scotia, Canada. He represented Bedford-Fall River and then Bedford in the Nova Scotia House of Assembly from 1999 to 2006 as a Progressive Conservative member.

He was born in Halifax and was educated at Dalhousie University. Christie is married to the former Joan Wilson. He received his designation as certified management accountant from the Canadian Society of Management Accountants and went on to serve as vice president of finance for H. H. Marshall Ltd. Christie was elected Mayor of Bedford in 1988 and served until 1991.

Christie first attempted to enter provincial politics in the 1998 election, but lost to Liberal incumbent Francene Cosman by 313 votes. He ran again in the 1999 election, winning the Bedford-Fall River riding by over 3,800 votes. In August 1999, Christie was appointed to the Executive Council of Nova Scotia as Minister of Community Services. In December 2002, Christie was shuffled to Minister of Service Nova Scotia and Municipal Relations. Following his re-election in 2003, Christie was named Minister of Finance. When Rodney MacDonald took over as premier in February 2006, Christie was left out of cabinet as he was planning to retire from politics.

References

1941 births
Canadian accountants
Dalhousie University alumni
Living people
Mayors of places in Nova Scotia
Members of the Executive Council of Nova Scotia
Progressive Conservative Association of Nova Scotia MLAs
People from Bedford, Nova Scotia
21st-century Canadian politicians
Finance ministers of Nova Scotia